Horst-Peter Kretschmer (19 October 1955 – 24 April 2015) was a German ice hockey player. He competed in the men's tournaments at the 1980 Winter Olympics and the 1988 Winter Olympics.

References

External links
 

1955 births
2015 deaths
German ice hockey players
Olympic ice hockey players of West Germany
Ice hockey players at the 1980 Winter Olympics
Ice hockey players at the 1988 Winter Olympics
People from Bad Tölz
Sportspeople from Upper Bavaria